An oak–heath forest is a plant community association and type of forest ecology. It is a deciduous forest type of well-drained, acidic soils, characterized by oaks (Quercus) and plants of the heath family (Ericaceae). It is commonly found in the high elevations of the eastern United States.  Such forest areas typically have a dense fibrous root layer at the surface of the soil, and in many areas predominate on south-facing or southwest-facing slopes. Many of the existing oak–heath forests once featured American chestnut as an important canopy species.

Oaks
Oaks (Quercus) characteristic of oak–heath associations include white oak (Quercus alba), black oak (Quercus velutina), scarlet oak (Quercus coccinea), chestnut oak (Quercus prinus), and red oak (Quercus rubra).

Heaths
Heath plants common to this ecology include mountain-laurel (Kalmia latifolia), various blueberries (genus Vaccinium), huckleberries (genus Gaylussacia), sourwood or sorrel-tree (Oxydendrum arboreum), and azaleas and rhododendrons (genus Rhododendron).  These are all usually shrubs, except for Oxydendron, which is usually a small tree.  There are also heaths that are sub-shrubs, usually trailing on the ground, including teaberry (Gaultheria procumbens) and trailing arbutus (Epigaea repens).

References

Temperate broadleaf and mixed forests in the United States
Ecoregions of the United States
 
Forest ecology
Forests of the United States